71 Degrees North is an English-language and Norwegian-produced reality television series on ITV which began broadcasting on 11 September 2010. Ten celebrities had to battle it out to see who would make it to the 71st parallel north, with challenges along the way. Mazda formerly sponsored the show, Continental tires were the final sponsors. The show was based on the Norwegian format 71° nord, which had been broadcast on TVNorge since 1999, and adapted in Sweden, Denmark, Poland, The Netherlands, and Belgium. The format was distributed by Banijay International.

In the UK, the show was made by London-based production company Fever Media and finished broadcasting its first series on 2 November 2010. The show was aired at 9 pm on Tuesday nights. Series 1 hosts were Gethin Jones and Kate Thornton. Marcus Patric was crowned champion after a closely fought final with Gavin Henson in the first series.

A second series was commissioned by ITV and started airing on 13 September 2011 hosted by Paddy McGuinness and Charlotte Jackson with 12 celebrities taking part. As with the first series, the second series aired on Tuesday evenings at 9 pm. In 2011, six countries acquired both series of the UK version. They were: TV Norge, Network Ten in Australia, TVNZ in New Zealand, Sic in Portugal, TV5 in Finland and Évasion in Canada.

On 19 June 2012, it was announced by ITV that 71 Degrees North had been axed after two series.

Plot
The show followed 10 celebrities who attempted to make it to the North Cape at 71 degrees north. 
At the end of each episode, the celebrity who performed worst on that day's challenge was eliminated.

Transmissions

Series 1

Marcus Patric was crowned champion after a closely fought final with Gavin Henson.

Hosts
 Gethin Jones
 Kate Thornton

Episodes

Celebrities

Challenges
The team that wins each challenge gets to stay in a log cabin, while the losing team has to camp.
(In episode 6, the winning team had the chance to spend the night in an Ice Hotel. Joe took this opportunity, Andrew opted for a warmer log cabin).

The contestants are split into Blue and Red teams at the start of each Challenge.
The winner of immunity from the previous Challenge becomes captain of one of the teams.

Series 2

On 1 March 2011, ITV confirmed that a second series has been commissioned and would begin airing on 13 September 2011, lasting 8 weeks before finishing on 1 November 2011.

Hosts
 Paddy McGuinness
 Charlotte Jackson

Episodes

Celebrities
On 18 July 2011, the 10 confirmed celebrities for Series 2 were revealed, They were:

Challenges
The team that wins each challenge gets to stay in a log cabin, while the losing team has to camp.

The contestants are split into Blue and Red teams at the start of each Challenge.
The winner of immunity from the previous Challenge becomes captain of one of the teams.
Team captains are in Bold.

International versions
The concept has been sold to several countries. The Danish, Belgium/Netherlands and UK versions were all filmed in Norway. The other series were recorded in the respective countries. Around 2000 or 2001, German broadcaster RTL2 were sold the format but no series was made.

Legend:
 Ongoing  
 Finished

Cancellation
On 19 June 2012, it was announced by ITV that 71 Degrees North had been axed after two series.

References

External links

.
.
Overview of the 71° North concept .

2010 British television series debuts
2011 British television series endings
2010s British reality television series
ITV reality television shows
English-language television shows